The Ananya Express is an Indian Railways Express-class train running between Kolkata (Chitpur) and Udaipur city.

It covers a distance of 2,134 km at an average speed of 60 km per hour, travelling through the Indian states of West Bengal, Jharkhand, Bihar, Uttar Pradesh and Rajasthan. It connects Eastern India with tourist spots such as Agra, Jaipur, Ajmer and Udaipur.

The service formerly ran between Sealdah and Ajmer, but was extended through to Udaipur.  class locomotive of Indian Railways. This train is converted in LHB train it has general, sleeper, AC 3tier, AC 2tier, first AC. Now the train's originating station has also been shifted to Kolkata. Now the train runs from Kolkata to Udaipur.

Traction
The train is hauled by a WAP-7 class locomotive from  Kolkata to UDAIPUR

References

External links

Transport in Udaipur
Transport in Kolkata
Express trains in India
Rail transport in Bihar
Rail transport in Rajasthan
Rail transport in West Bengal
Rail transport in Jharkhand
Rail transport in Uttar Pradesh
Named passenger trains of India